I Do or Rent a Wife (international working title), is a 2006 French romantic comedy film directed by Éric Lartigau, based on an original idea by Alain Chabat. The film stars Charlotte Gainsbourg, Alain Chabat and Bernadette Lafont. It is Chabat and Gainsbourg's third collaboration, after Ils se marièrent et eurent beaucoup d'enfants (2004) and The Science of Sleep (2006). This film was officially remade into an Indian Telugu language film Manmadhudu 2 released in August 2019.

Plot summary
Luis Campos (Alain Chabat), 43, happily single, mollycoddled by his family (mother and 5 sisters, who by design established by his late father Hercule form a kind of family council known as the G7), has a successful career as a perfumer and an easy life. Tired of taking care of him, the G7 decide he should get married within a year. The problem is Luis does not want any kind of serious relationship since they ruined his first true love. After turning down all the girls introduced to him, he gets an idea: "rent" his best friend's sister, Emma (Charlotte Gainsbourg), turn her into the perfect bride-to-be, and make her not show up on their wedding day. That way, Luis thinks his family will leave him alone. Unfortunately for him, his family likes Emma and blames him when she apparently jilts him at the altar. He then comes up with an alternate plan to have Emma act horribly towards his family so they will not like her anymore. The two begin to fall in love so Luis finally stands up to his family, confesses his schemes and finally settles down with Emma.

Cast
 Alain Chabat - Luis Costa
 Charlotte Gainsbourg - Emma
 Bernadette Lafont - Geneviève Costa
 Wladimir Yordanoff - Francis Bertoff 
 Grégoire Oestermann - Pierre-Yves
 Véronique Barrault - Catherine 
 Marie-Armelle Deguy - Axelle
 Aïssa Maïga - Kirsten Hansen
 Katia Lewkowicz - Carole
 Louise Monot - Maxine
 Anne Marivin - Sales Associate
 Éric Lartigau - A passerby

Production
Alain Chabat originally came up with the idea for the film and planned to produce the film and write the script. Director Éric Lartigau asked him to play the role of Luis so he rewrote the character as an older man.  Over a five-year period Chabat's original script went through seven different rewrites by four other scriptwriters. Chabat decided to include a scene where the character of Emma watches an action film. After comparing different Chinese kung fu films, he settled on a 100-second fight sequence from the Indian film Muthu (1995).

The film was shot in Mézy-sur-Seine, and in different parts of Paris, including the Parisian suburb of Pantin.

Box office reception
Released on November 1, 2006 in France, the film went straight to #1 at the box office, grossing over a million tickets. It spent six consecutive weeks in the box office top 10.  By December 19, the film had reached the 3 million tickets sold mark. It eventually sold just over 3.5 million tickets, making it the second most successful film of 2007 at the French box office.

Awards and nominations
César Awards (France)
Nominated: Best Actor – Leading Role (Alain Chabat)
Nominated: Best Actress – Leading Role (Charlotte Gainsbourg)
Nominated: Best Actress – Supporting Role (Bernadette Lafont)

References

External links
  Official site
 
 I Do (How to Get Married and Stay Single) trailer (in French with English subtitles)
  Prête-moi ta main at allocine.fr - pics, trailers
 

2006 films
2006 romantic comedy films
2000s French-language films
French romantic comedy films
2000s French films